The term Sinosphere usually refers to the East Asian cultural sphere, states within East and Southeast Asia that have been significantly influenced by Chinese culture.

It may also refer to:
 James Matisoff's name for the Mainland Southeast Asia linguistic area
 The Sinophone world, the area (mostly East Asia and Southeast Asia) in which Chinese languages are spoken by the majority or a significant number of people
 Sinocentrism, an ideology that the lands which make up China is the cultural, political, or economic center of the world
 Greater China, a geographical region comprising Mainland China, Hong Kong, Macau, and Taiwan

See also 
 Little China (ideology), an ideology in which various historical Japanese, Korean, and Vietnamese regimes considered themselves "China" and legitimate inheritors of the Chinese civilization
 Sinophile, one who demonstrates a strong interest and love for Chinese culture or its people